The Indian national cricket team toured Bangladesh from 15 to 19 June 2014 to play a three-match One Day International (ODI) series against the Bangladesh national cricket team. India won the One Day International series 2–0, with one match being abandoned.

Squads

ODI series

1st ODI

2nd ODI

3rd ODI

Broadcasters

References

External links

2014 in Indian cricket
2014 in Bangladeshi cricket
International cricket competitions in 2014
Bangladeshi cricket seasons from 2000–01
2014